Jonathan Wallace is an American politician from Georgia. Wallace is a former Democratic Party member of Georgia House of Representatives from District 119 from Nov. 27, 2017, until Jan. 14, 2019. He won a November 2017 Special Election to win the seat vacated by Republican Chuck Williams, who was appointed by Governor Nathan Deal to serve as Director of the Georgia Forestry Commission.

On Nov. 6, 2018, Wallace was defeated for re-election by Republican Marcus Wiedower.

On January 13, 2020, Wallace announced he would be challenging Wiedower in the 2020 election to return to the State House.
He lost the general election on November 3, 2020 to Marcus Wiedower (Republican Party)

Electoral history

References

Year of birth missing (living people)
Living people
Democratic Party members of the Georgia House of Representatives